N Subramanian Chettiar was an Indian businessman, philanthropist, politician and former Member of the Legislative Assembly of Tamil Nadu. He was elected to the Tamil Nadu legislative assembly as an Indian National Congress candidate from Srirangam constituency in 1962 election.

References 

Members of the Tamil Nadu Legislative Assembly
Indian National Congress politicians from Tamil Nadu
Year of birth missing
Possibly living people